Swoopes Knobs is a ridge in the U.S. state of West Virginia.

Swoopes Knobs was named after Joseph Swope, a pioneer settler.

References

Landforms of Monroe County, West Virginia
Ridges of West Virginia